Heyat Basketball Shahrekord Basketball Club was an Iranian professional basketball club based in Shahrekord, Iran. They competed in the Iranian Basketball Super League.

Notable former players
  Rasoul Mozaffari
  Behnam Yakhchali
  Srđan Jovanović
  Dušan Stević

External links
page on Asia-Basket

Basketball teams in Iran
Sport in Chaharmahal and Bakhtiari Province